The Real Frank Zappa Book is an autobiography/memoir by Frank Zappa, co-written by Peter Occhiogrosso, and published by Poseidon Press. The text is copyright 1989 Frank Zappa, and copyright 1990 Simon & Schuster, Inc. Since 1999, the book has been published in paperback by Touchstone Books.

Contents
The Real Frank Zappa Book has 19 chapters:

INTRODUCTION Book? What book?
How Weird Am I, Anyway?
There Goes the Neighborhood
An Alternative to College
Are We Having a Good Time Yet?
The Log Cabin
Send In the Clowns
Drool, Britannia
All About Music
A Chapter for My Dad
The One You've Been Waiting For
Sticks & Stones
America Drinks and Goes Marching
All About Schmucks
Marriage (as a Dada Concept)
"Porn Wars"
Church and State
Practical Conservatism
Failure
The Last Word

Reviews
Vanity Fair wrote of the book, "An autobiography of mostly hilarious stories...fireside war tales from the big bad days of the rockin' sixties...primer of the sonic avant-garde, the book bashes favorite Zappa targets and dashes a few myths about the man."

The New York Post said, "This book belongs in every home".

References

1989 non-fiction books
American biographies
Frank Zappa
Music autobiographies
Poseidon Press books
Picador (imprint) books